The Mamiri Forest Reserve is found in Ghana.
Mamiri lies on the boundary between the wet evergreen and moist evergreen forest zones (Hall and Swaine, 1981).

The terrain is hilly, with the hills strongly dissected by steep-sided deep valleys. These valleys become flooded during the rainy season, creating swampy habitats.

The estimate terrain elevation above sea level is 128 metres.

Ape status
There are no recent estimates of chimpanzee abundance in Ghana. The last estimate was made by Teleki's (1989), which estimated between 300 and 500 chimpanzees to be present in Ghana. The chimpanzee's presence was confirmed during field surveys in 2005 at this site (Oates, 2006), however recent surveys in 2009 failed to confirm their survival. (Gatti, 2009).

References

Hall, J.B. and Swaine, M.D. (1981) Distribution and Ecology of Vascular Plants in Tropical Rain Forest. W. Junk Publishers, Den Haag.
Oates, J. (2006) Primate Conservation in the Forests of Western Ghana. Unpublished report to the Wildlife Division, Forestry Commission, Ghana

Forest reserves of Ghana
Eastern Guinean forests
Protected areas established in 1949
1949 establishments in Gold Coast (British colony)